Ancona station (also known as Ancona Junction) was an Atchison, Topeka and Santa Fe Railway station in the unincorporated community of Ancona, Illinois. It a major junction station on the railway since it was point was where the Pekin Branch (also known as the Pekin District) split from the main line. Ancona was the eastern point where the Santa Fe decided to build track west to existing track in Kansas City in 1889. (It used former Chicago and St. Louis Railway trackage to reach Chicago) Freight trains still pass on the double-tracked main line and the location provides a good location for railfans. The branch line to Pekin was abandoned in 1982 although the former right-of-way can still easily be seen.

References

External links
 Pictures of Ancona, Illinois

Atchison, Topeka and Santa Fe Railway stations
Former railway stations in Illinois
Transportation buildings and structures in Livingston County, Illinois